Feliciano Alberto Viera Borges (8 November 1872 – 13 November 1927) was a Uruguayan political figure.

Background
He was a member of the Colorado Party and closely identified with the liberal former president José Batlle y Ordóñez, who long dominated Uruguayan political life. Prior to becoming president, Viera served Batlle's second government as interior minister. He served as the President of the Senate of Uruguay from 1907 to 1912.

President of Uruguay
He was President of Uruguay from 1915 to 1919. Among prominent figures who served in his administration was Baltasar Brum, who occupied the interior and subsequently the foreign affairs ministry.

Uruguay was more closely identified with the Allied cause in World War I than was neighbouring Argentina, cutting diplomatic relations with the German Empire in late 1917. On September 8, 1917, Viera received the Grand Cross of the Legion of Honor of France.

In a speech addressed to deputies and senators during his first year as president, Viera indicated that he would continue the reform program of his predecessor Batlle, stating that “I will especially ask Your Honor for the sanction of laws that you are already studying, some that ensure and improve the situation of the worker and others that prevent conflicts between capital and the proletariat whose harmony we must seek as fertile sources of peace and progress. Thus, I will ask you to enact laws on workplace accidents, women's and children's work, working hours, old-age pension, child protection, labor legislation, minimum wage, weekly rest and others.” Viera has however been described as more conservative than Batlle. This was arguably demonstrated in 1916 when Viera indicated, according to one study, that “he disapproved of the enthusiasm for experiment and reform.” This occurred following the introduction of a constitutional reform proposal, in which the first election conducted by secret ballot was held which saw Battlism lose. Upon hearing the results, Viera stated “Well, gentlemen, we won’t advance any more in the area of social and economic legislation; we should reconcile capital with labor. We have moved too quickly; we must pause in the task. We should not sponsor new laws of this type and even paralyze those that are being considered in the legislature.”

According to his finance minister M.C. Martinez, as noted by one study, “The president feels that it is necessary to call a halt because the machine has been going too fast,” but “It does not mean that progressive initiative will be abandoned by the State – except when it enervates private initiative (the essential to national greatness) or disturbs our credit. Nor does it mean giving capital privileges over labour.” Indeed, a number of reforms were carried out during Viera's presidency. A law enacted at the end of 1915 established that the effective work of workers in various establishments such as shipyards and factories “could not last more than eight hours.” The average term of daily work could be increased, but on condition “that it never exceed the legal maximum of 48 hours for every six days of work,” while “No factory, company or house could use workers who worked in another establishment during the maximum hours authorized by law.” A 1918 law prohibited night work in various food-making establishments such as bakeries, with fines in cases of infractions and recidivism. In terms of social welfare, the Derecho a la Vida (Right to Life) prescribed “the supply of food to the inhabitants of the country, when they lack means of subsistence, etc.” The law of July the 12th 1916 provided “that food be provided in the Police Stations, Barracks or appropriate premises, to all the inhabitants of the country who are without work and who lack means of subsistence.”  A 1919 law established minimum annual pensions; partially aimed at helping those who were indigent and disabled.

A presidential message from 1916 also noted various developments that had taken place in Public Assistance. For instance, the Maternity Pavilion and shelter for pregnant women were inaugurated, “which includes the solution of the problem of defense and protection of helpless mothers, abandoned or temporarily unable to attend to their care and subsistence.” Some improvements were implemented in other Assistance services, including “acquisition of land adjoining the Eermín Ferreira Hospital, repairs in some rooms of the Maciel Hospital and of surgical instruments for the same, repairs in one of the pavilions of the Pereira Rosell Hospital, increase in the rolling stock of the Permanent Medical Service, increase in the technical administration staff, etc. of the aforementioned service, the works of the Gynecology Pavilion, for which the amount of $109,437.55 has been paid, repairs to the "Doecker" pavilions of the Asilo Luis Piñeyro clel Campo, etc.” Improvements were also made in field establishments, such as “the construction of four pavilions in the Santa Lucía Colony - Insane Asylum, which will allow 300 inmates to be taken out of Vilardebó Hospital, thus alleviating, in part, the state of overcrowding in that said hospital is located; the works and acquisitions that have enabled the Galán y Rocha Nursing Home Hospital in Paysandú; the acquisition of land adjacent to the San José Hospital for its expansion, repairs to the buildings occupied by the El Salto Children's Asylum and the Artigas and Plores hospitals.” Also, as noted in the same message, “The movement in the internal services, external, emergency, home and home protection childhood during the year 1915 shows a notable increase compared to previous years, as logical sequence of the implementation of new services and the expansion and improvement of existing ones.”

In 1916, the Assembly resolved to declare a national holiday on May the 1st as a labor holiday. Decrees of the 25th of June 1915 made specific provision “for the safety of railway employees and those engaged in factories, mines and quarries using explosive substances.” In addition, a decree of the 15th of November 1918 provided specific regulation of working conditions in the mines. In 1916, The Executive Power requested and obtained the establishment of two secondary schools in Montevideo, while another law accorded high school students who had completed the four years of the secondary school curriculum “the right to enter the Schools of Comercio, Agronomy and Veterinary Medicine and in secondary education courses.” A law of 1916 abolished tuition and examination fees for regulated secondary school students, while authorizing the Executive Branch “to extend the franchise to all regulated or free students, once the state of finances permitted it.” In 1918 the first law for the safeguarding of employed women and children was adopted, which required the provision of seats for such workers. That same year the Executive Power was authorized in “to build municipal laundries in all the cities of the coastal and interior departments.” 

A law was also enacted in which children “under two years of age given to wet nurses outside the parents' home were placed under the surveillance of the State, in order to ensure their life and health; those entrusted to caregivers outside the parents' home to be artificially fed; those of mothers placed as wet-nurses or who had received other children at their homes to breastfeed them. Public Assistance was entrusted with the direction of the service.” In addition, emergency services were improved in 1918 "by a new regulation of first aid on public roads, at home and in any other place where it was needed." A law of February the 26th 1919 authorized the government “to contract for important sanitation work in 15 cities.”

A 1916 law declared “unseizable capital up to $5,000 and income up to $1,200 per year, in popular operations carried out by the State Insurance Bank.” To help stevedores a central office was created by the Executive Power by decree of the 15th of April 1916 “which was to register all stevedores and assign them to work in turn.” However, the eight-hour day and successive strikes “forced the office to enrol a larger number of men, with a consequent spreading of work so broadly that earnings declined.” A law of the 21st of March 1918 authorized prenda agraria operations, which began in 1920. This credit “was a form of current account for the cattleman who could pay off the loan as he sold the property on which it was based; it was intended to prevent forced liquidation at ruinous prices when the market was heavily depressed.” A law of the 27th of February 1919 established a postal savings system which offered the advantages “that deposits could not be attached, that women could deposit and withdraw without their husbands’ knowledge, and that the service could be utilized in small communities where there was no branch of the Bank.” Rules and regulations promulgated by the President of the Republic for the prevention of accidents to workmen prescribed, among other things, “that motors and dynamos used by industrial companies shall be inclosed by railings or bars, and persons not connected with the service are forbidden entry to such inclosures.” Also, in the wood packing industry “workmen whose eyes may be injured by shavings, particles of dust, etc, are required to wear glasses. This rule also applies to workmen in foundries where there is danger of injury from sparks, sand, etc.” A tuition-free School of Modelling, aimed at promoting the study of art and open to all who showed any skill on modelling and drawing, was established by the government. A presidential decree of January the 22nd 1919 authorized the insurance of national realty in the State Securities Bank against fire. Under the same decree “automobiles, trucks, and other vehicles for motor transportation in the service of public works are also insured against all loss, risk, and liability for damages.”

By resolution of the Executive Power, a project relative to the defense against syphilis, formulated by the President of the National Council of Hygiene, was approved, “according to which the Prophylactic Institute of Syphilis is created and the installation of several dispensaries is established where those who attend them are treated free of charge and medicines are provided. With the installation of these dispensaries, which are already fully operational, the task of defending against that disease, a social evil that tends to become more widespread every day, making its destructive action felt in the individual and their offspring.” The premises of the Military Hospital was also one of improvements, among which included “the inauguration of a pavilion destined to shelter patients subjected to Military Justice.” According to a presidential message from 1918, “The project of the Director of Public Assistance has begun to be executed, by which the number of polyclinics is increased, services that provide so much good to the needy classes, and that have the advantage of accustoming families to frequenting the doctor, distancing them of the healer, and allowing at the same time that diseases can be attacked in their first signs, giving notions of hygiene and general prophylaxis that, transmitted to the home, prevented the development of many diseases.” Also, “In accordance with the aforementioned project, a surgical polyclinic was created at the Máciel Hospital, a medical-surgical polyclinic at each of the Gota de Leche Clinics, a medical polyclinic and another surgical polyclinic at the Luis Piñeyro del Campo Asylum, Hospital Fermín Ferreira and Vilardebo Hospital. For the same project, the city is divided into four large radios, and the sick must go to the service that corresponds to them according to their homes. In addition, a medical-surgical polyclinic for children was created at the Hospital del Salto.” In addition, “the function of a Convalescent Colony has been studied in which, in accordance with the laws that govern the institution, men, women and children over 7 years of age will be assisted from Public Assistance establishments.” For those in Primary Public Instruction, a hundred assistantships authorized by law of October 1917, “which will allow instructing four or five a thousand more children, at least.”

According to a presidential message from 1918, the National Inspection of Livestock and Agriculture “through the agronomic inspection services, chemical and seed laboratories, crops experimental, agronomic information, sections forestry and marks and signs of cattle, and other technical dependencies, has carried out a task as persistent as useful.” The Agricultural Inspectors “dedicated themselves preferably to the extensive teaching of agriculture and livestock, through conferences, practical lessons, consultations, advice, publications, demonstrative experiences, incentive contests, etc., taking agricultural education to the rural workers themselves in a practical way that has translated into a real improvement in working conditions and an appreciable increase in production.” As a complement to this work, the National Inspection published teaching works on the cultivation of flax, corn, fodder, potatoes, beet, etc., based, preferably, on studies and experimental works, all of which were distributed free of charge. In terms of industrial teaching, “With the intervention of the respective Council, the Executive Power authorized the creation of ten night industrial courses for workers and apprentices, of normal courses for the training of industrial education teachers, of three primary industrial schools, of a library and reading room, of an official journal of industrial education and the suppression of some unnecessary workshops, as well as the installation of new ones in the Industrial School number 1.”

In assessing his government’s record, Viera argued that: “During my administration as president ...... I made an effort to carry out the Colorado program, especially in its constitutional part, accepting for this purpose all that conjuration of passions provoked against us by the essential points of the reformist program: the multiple Executive and the separation of the Church and the State. We accept and contribute to the same degree to its success – many social laws. The Working Day, the Night Work, the Old Age Pensions, the Right to Life, all these problems of urgent solution, because the interest of the humble classes so required, were resolved during my government. Legislative action also tended to perfect our legislation on divorce, to improve the fate of natural children, to apply a more humane and scientific interest in the criminal solutions of our time, advocating in this regard that the conditional sentence be an institute of our legal organization.”

Post Presidency
In 1919 Viera relinquished the presidency and was succeeded by Baltasar Brum. He then became chairman of the National Council of Administration (prime minister), holding the post until 1921.

He died on 13 November 1927, aged 55.

See also
 Politics of Uruguay

References

1872 births
1927 deaths
People from Salto Department
Uruguayan people of Canarian descent
Colorado Party (Uruguay) politicians
Presidents of Uruguay
Prime Ministers of Uruguay
Interior ministers of Uruguay
Members of the Chamber of Representatives of Uruguay (1899–1902)
Members of the Chamber of Representatives of Uruguay (1902–1905)
Members of the Chamber of Representatives of Uruguay (1905–1908)
Presidents of the Senate of Uruguay
Members of the Senate of Uruguay (1905–1908)
Members of the Senate of Uruguay (1908–1911)
Members of the Senate of Uruguay (1911–1914)
Uruguay in World War I